Michelle St. John (born August 26, 1967) is a Canadian actress, singer, producer and director who has been involved in creative projects in theatre, film, television and music since the 1980s. Her directorial debut, Colonization Road, is a 2016 feature-length documentary that premiered at imagineNATIVE Film + Media Arts Festival.

Career 
Michelle St. John grew up in Toronto, Ontario, as the daughter of musician Wayne St. John and Jewish mother Rochelle (Gruskin) St. John. Michelle was born in Bakersfield, California on August 26, 1967. Her birth name was Michelle L. Richardson. Michelle began her career in film as an actress. One of her first roles was as the protagonist in the 1989 CBC film Where the Spirit Lives, for which she won a Gemini Award for Best Actress - Dramatic Program.

In 1992, St. John won her second Gemini Award for Best Guest Performance in a Series by an Actor or Actress for her role as Merrily Swanson on E.N.G.. She has worked on many television series, including Northern Exposure and By Way of the Stars and she voiced the character of Nakoma in Disney’s 1995 animated film Pocahontas.

In 1998, she had a cameo as Velma in Chris Eyre’s award winning Smoke Signals. The screenwriter, Sherman Alexie, describes the scene as a "trap door" for Indigenous audiences to fall through, while those less familiar with Indigenous culture will pass right by.

She co-founded Turtle Gals Performance Ensemble in 1999 with Jani Lauzon and Monique Mojica. As Co-Managing Artistic Director, she co-created, produced and toured The Scrubbing Project, an exploration of mixed Indigenous heritage, The Triple Truth, which was nominated for a Dora Award and The Only Good Indian…, a multi-media musical.

St. John has produced several short films and theatre productions with partner Marie Clements.  She recently collaborated with Shane Belcourt as co-producer on two Heritage Minutes, Chanie Wenjack and Naskumituwin (Treaty) and the independent feature film Red Rover.

She came across the inspiration for Colonization Road, which she wrote, produced, and directed, while touring with Turtle Gals in Fort Frances, Ontario. The film follows comedian Ryan McMahon as he explores the historical significance of this road in his hometown, and how its endurance reflects the uncomfortable reality of Canada’s colonial past and present.

The World Premiere of Colonization Road was on October 23, 2016 at imagineNATIVE Film + Media Arts Festival, and it has been nominated for a 2017 Canadian Screen Award in Donald Brittain Social Political Documentary category. It also received a Golden Sheaf Awards for Best History Documentary.

Filmography

Film

Television

Other work

Awards 
1990 - Gemini Award: Best Actress - Dramatic Program (Where the Spirit Lives)
1992 - Gemini Award: Best Guest Performance in a Series by an Actor or Actress (E.N.G. Season 2, Episode 11)
2003 - FAITA Award: Outstanding Performance by an Actress in a Film (The Business of Fancydancing)
2011 - American Indian Movie Award: Best Actress (Every Emotion Costs)

References

External links

20th-century Canadian actresses
21st-century Canadian actresses
Actresses from Bakersfield, California
Actresses from Toronto
First Nations actresses
Canadian film actresses
Canadian television actresses
Canadian voice actresses
Canadian documentary film directors
Canadian women film directors
Film directors from Toronto
First Nations filmmakers
Canadian Screen Award winners
Canadian women documentary filmmakers